The molecular formula C14H22N2O3 (molar mass: 266.34 g/mol, exact mass: 266.1630 u) may refer to:

 Atenolol
 Bucolome (Paramidine)
 Practolol
 Trimetazidine

Molecular formulas